Thornton ward is an administrative division of the London Borough of Lambeth, United Kingdom.

The ward comprises the communities of Clapham Park and the Hyde Farm Estate.  The ward shares the borough's western boundary with Wandsworth along Cavendish Road and Emmanuel Road alongside Tooting Bec Common.  The south eastern boundary then continues along Emmanuel Road and New Park Road to the A205 South Circular Road.  The boundaries of northern part of the ward follow the boundaries of the Clapham Park estate east of Kings Avenue and then cross to run down Clarence Avenue and Poynders Road.

The ward is located in the Streatham parliamentary constituency.

Political history 
In the London local elections of 1968, the Conservatives took control of the Greater London Council on a landslide. Included in this was Lambeth, where the Conservatives also swept to power. In the previously safe Labour ward of Ferndale, they took all three seats. Third of the three elected was future Prime Minister John Major, seventy votes ahead of his nearest Labour rival. Major, who had grown up nearby, was made Chairman of the Housing Committee, and responsible for overseeing the building of several large council estates. However, in 1971, the trend was reversed, both in London as a whole and Lambeth. This time, Major instead contested Thornton, where the Conservatives had enjoyed a comfortable victory in 1968, but Labour took all three seats back, and Major came fifth overall, losing his place on the council.

Lambeth Council elections 

 

 

 

Jane Edbrooke was previously an Oval ward councillor (2010-2018).

References

External links
Lambeth Borough Council profile for the ward
Thornton ward election results on Lambeth website
Thornton Life: local website produced by Thornton Labour Councillors

Wards of the London Borough of Lambeth